Brenda Irene Chamberlain (17 March 1912 – 11 July 1971) was a Welsh artist, poet and writer. She won the first two Gold Medals awarded by the National Eisteddfod of Wales in the Fine Art category, for her paintings Girl with a Siamese Cat (1951) and The Cristin Children (1953), and her written works include Tide-race, a memoir of 15 years spent living on Bardsey Island. An expatriate on the island of Hydra, Greece, from 1961 to 1967, she then returned to Wales, where she died in 1971. Her papers are preserved by the National Library of Wales; examples of her artworks are found in several collections.

Early life and education

Chamberlain was born in Bangor, the daughter of Francis Thomas Chamberlain and Elsie Cooil Chamberlain. Her father worked for the railway. Her mother served a term on the Bangor Borough Council, and was later Mayor of Bangor during World War II. 

In 1931, Chamberlain began her studies as an artist at the Royal Academy Schools in London.

Works 
Chamberlain ran the Caseg Press in Bethesda, Wales, with her then-husband the artist John Petts, and the poet Alun Lewis. The collective produced postcards and bookplates, for which Chamberlain made woodcuts. Caseg Broadsheets featured poetry by Chamberlain and others. The cottage they shared, Ty'r Mynydd, bears a plaque commemorating their work.

Chamberlain also produced prose works, including Tide-Race (1962), a memoir of life at Carreg, Bardsey Island, where she lived and worked from 1947 until 1962. The publication of Tide-Race coincided with a solo exhibition of Chamberlain's paintings at the Zwemmer Gallery in London.

Chamberlain won the first two Gold Medals awarded by the National Eisteddfod of Wales for Fine Art, in 1951 for the painting Girl with a Siamese Cat and in 1953 for The Cristin Children.

In 1961 Chamberlain went to live on the Greek island of Hydra, but returned to Wales in 1967. Her novel A Rope of Vines draws from her time in Hydra, while her play The Protagonists (published 2013, first performed 1968) details the 1967 right-wing coup which led to the Greek junta.

Legacy
There are artworks by Chamberlain in the National Museum Wales, National Library of Wales, Bangor University, Cyfarthfa Castle and Royal Holloway, University of London. There is a collection of her papers, including sketches, letters, poems, photographs, diaries, and unpublished works, in the National Library of Wales.

Kate Holman published an academic biography of Brenda Chamberlain in 1997. Jill Piercy published another biography of Chamberlain in 2013.

Personal life
Before the Second World War, Chamberlain moved in with the artist John Petts. They married in 1935, and in 1936 they moved to Rachub, a village near Bethesda. The cottage they shared, Ty'r Mynydd, bears a plaque commemorating their work. The couple were divorced in 1944. 

Chamberlain died in 1971, age 59, in Bangor, after an overdose of sedatives. Her remains were interred at Glanadda Cemetery in Bangor.

Published works
The Green Heart (1958) 
Tide-Race (1962)
The Water Castle (1964)
A Rope of Vines (1965)
Poems with Drawings (1969)

Further reading
Alun Lewis and the Making of the Caseg Broadsheets, 1969
Kate Holman, Brenda Chamberlain, 1997
Jill Piercy, Brenda Chamberlain, Artist & Writer, 2013

References

External links

 – archive held at the National Library of Wales

1912 births
1971 deaths
20th-century Welsh women artists
20th-century Welsh novelists
20th-century Welsh painters
20th-century Welsh poets
20th-century Welsh women writers
20th-century memoirists
Alumni of the Royal Academy Schools
Anglo-Welsh poets
British women memoirists
Drug-related deaths in Wales
Members of The Welsh Group
People from Bangor, Gwynedd
Writers from Bangor, Gwynedd
Welsh Eisteddfod Gold Medal winners
Welsh expatriates in Greece
Welsh women painters
Welsh women novelists
Welsh women poets
Welsh memoirists